ChakJamal village is located in Sahdai Buzurg block of Vaishali district in Bihar, India. It is situated 1 km away from sub-district headquarter Sahdai Buzurg and 25 km away from district headquarter Hajipur. As per 2009 stats, ChakJamal village is also a gram panchayat.

People
People of this village are living in very peaceful manner. This village having very proud history. Agriculture is the main profession of this village. Still this village is waiting for Industrial development. Education, Drinking water, Road and Electricity are the main concern of this village. Young generation is more attracted towards mobile, Laptop and computer technology these days. If banks and finance institutions proved loan and other financial support to the villagers, this village will see the real development. Medical and health services has to be improved.

Geography
According to Census 2011 information the location code or village code of Chak Jamal village is 236045. The total geographical area of village is 167 hectares. ChakJamal has a total population of 3,430 peoples. There are about 667 houses in ChakJamal village. Hajipur is nearest town to ChakJamal which is approximately 25 km away.

Transport
By TrainNearest Railway Station- Sahadei Buzurg about 1 km away.Public/Private BusAvailable in radius of 1 km.

Education
Government Middle School, ChakJamal for the study of class 1 to 8th.

See also
 List of villages in Vaishali district

Villages in Vaishali district